Area code 417 is a telephone area code in the North American Numbering Plan (NANP) for the southwestern quadrant of Missouri, including the cities of Branson, Carl Junction, Carthage, Joplin, Lebanon, Neosho, Nixa, Ozark, Springfield, and West Plains. Area code 417 was created in 1951 as a split from area code 816.

History
When the American Telephone and Telegraph Company (AT&T) created a universal North American telephone numbering plan for Operator Toll Dialing in 1947, Missouri was divided into two numbering plan areas (NPAs). Area code 816 served points generally north and west of Columbia and Jefferson City, while area code 314 served the eastern third of the state, including St. Louis. In 1951, area code 417 was created as the third code in the state, for southwestern Missouri, comprising the southern half of the original 816 boundaries.

Despite with the presence of Springfield, the state's third-largest city, 417 is one of the most sparsely populated numbering plan areas in the nation.  Despite the growing proliferation of cell phones and smart phones (particularly in and around Springfield), it is projected that a second area code will not be required in southwest Missouri until about 2027.

Prior to October 2021, area code 417 had telephone numbers assigned for the central office code 988. In 2020, 988 was designated nationwide as a dialing code for the National Suicide Prevention Lifeline, which created a conflict for exchanges that permit seven-digit dialing. This area code was therefore scheduled to transition to ten-digit dialing by October 24, 2021.

References

External links

List of exchanges from AreaCodeDownload.com, 417 Area Code

Telecommunications-related introductions in 1951
417
417